Wanda Brown (born May 31, 1966) is an American politician who served in the Missouri House of Representatives from 2011 to 2019.

References

1966 births
Living people
Republican Party members of the Missouri House of Representatives
Women state legislators in Missouri
21st-century American politicians
21st-century American women politicians